Niesthrea is a genus of scentless plant bugs in the family Rhopalidae. There are about 13 described species in Niesthrea.

Species
These 13 species belong to the genus Niesthrea:

 Niesthrea agnes Chopra, 1973
 Niesthrea ashlocki Froeschner, 1989
 Niesthrea brevicauda Chopra, 1973
 Niesthrea dentatus Chopra, 1973
 Niesthrea dignus Chopra, 1973
 Niesthrea fenestratus (Signoret, 1859)
 Niesthrea josei Göllner-Scheiding, 1989
 Niesthrea louisianica Sailer, 1961
 Niesthrea pictipes (Stål, 1859)
 Niesthrea sidae (Fabricius, 1794)
 Niesthrea similis Chopra, 1973
 Niesthrea ventralis (Signoret, 1859)
 Niesthrea vincentii (Westwood, 1842)

References

Further reading

External links

 

Articles created by Qbugbot
Rhopalinae
Pentatomomorpha genera